Lesly Bengaber (born 12 December 1979 in Les Abymes, Guadeloupe), is a French professional basketball player playing for SLUC Nancy. He measures 1.96 m.

Clubs 

 1999–2000 :  Ajaccio (Nationale 1)
 2000–2001 :  Denain (Nationale 2)
 2001–2003 :  Bondy (Pro B, then Nationale 1)
 2003 – beginning 2005 :  Rueil (Pro B)
 Beginning 2005–2006 :  Antibes (Pro B)
 2006–2007 :  Bourg-en-Bresse (Pro A)
 2007–2009 :  Clermont (Pro A)
 Since 2009 :  SLUC Nancy Basket (Pro A)

Honours 
 Champion Guadeloupe 1998–1999 
 Champion Antilles-Guyane 1999

References 

1979 births
Living people
People from Les Abymes
French men's basketball players